Göynücek is a town in Amasya Province, lying just to the north of central Turkey. It is the seat of Göynücek District. Its population is 4,938 (2021). Göynücek sits in the valley of the river Çekerek. The mayor is Kadir Fatih Erdoğan (MHP).

Climate
Göynücek has a hot-summer Mediterranean climate (Köppen: Csa).

References

External links
 Göynücek municipality official website

Populated places in Amasya Province
Towns in Turkey
Göynücek District